Jose Luis Fernandez (born November 18, 1971) is the head coach of the University of South Florida women's basketball team, starting in 2000.

Fernandez was officially named head coach on Nov. 14, 2000, just seven months after arriving at USF as an assistant coach. He has led the Bulls to eight trips to the NCAA Tournament and nine WNIT appearances, which includes the 2009 WNIT title and a semifinal appearance in 2014. The Bulls have also advanced to the American Athletic Conference (AAC) Tournament championship game in six of the past nine seasons and have made at least the semifinal round during every season in the AAC.

Named the 2018 and 2021 American Athletic Conference Coach of the Year, head coach Jose Fernandez has, during his 20-plus seasons, built the Bulls into a perennial Top 25 program. Under his guidance, USF has transformed from a program with only five winning seasons to a regular participant in the NCAA Tournament.

During the 2020-21 campaign, the Green and Gold made program history winning its first American Athletic Conference regular-season championship and followed that up with The American Tournament title in Fort Worth, Texas. During their tournament run, the Bulls defeated Wichita State, 48–44, Tulane, 51–47, and rival UCF, 64–54, the same Knights team that USF beat, 65–52, to win the regular-season crown on March 2 in the Yuengling Center.

Season by season results 
2021-22 (NCAA Tournament)

During the season, Fernandez picked up his 400 win in a game against High Point.

2020-21 (NCAA Tournament)

Despite South Florida attempting to return to a sense of normalcy, the Bulls still had to deal with their share of COVID-19 obstacles and setbacks during the season, but through it all, USF advanced to its seventh NCAA Tournament and its fourth appearance in the Round of 32. The Green and Gold played a modified regular-season schedule of 24 games – four nonconference and 20 in The American – with next to no fans at home due to restrictions, and either the postponement or cancelation of eight games, including seven-straight and still posted a 19–4 record and a 12–2 mark in The American. Of the four nonconference games, two came against two of the nation's elite at home, defending national champion Baylor and Mississippi State. The Bulls came close to shocking the women's basketball world against the fourth-ranked Lady Bears, falling 67–62, but returned the next game and defeated the No. 6-ranked Bulldogs in overtime, the highest-ranked team they have ever beaten. That win was the first of 13-straight victories for South Florida, a program record and the seventh longest in the nation at that point. USF started the season receiving votes and rose to its highest ranking in program history, No. 12 in the Feb. 15 Associated Press Top 25 poll.

After winning The American regular-season title, South Florida made another statement when the league announced its postseason award winners, and six Bulls – including head coach Jose Fernandez – were honored. Fernandez was named the AAC Coach of the Year, while Elisa Pinzan was tabbed the league's Most Improved Player, and Maria Alvarez was chosen as the Co-Sixth Player of the Year. Also, Bethy Mununga and Elena Tsineke were named to The American All-Conference First Team, Pinzan was a Second Team selection and Sydni Harvey earned Third Team honors. Following South Florida's historic showing in the conference tournament, en route to the tournament title, Harvey was named tournament Most Outstanding Player after averaging a team-high 16.0 points per game during the championship. Tsineke, the championship game leading scorer (23 points), and Mununga joined Harvey on the All-Tournament Team. In addition, Fernandez was a finalist for the 2021 United States Marine Corps/WBCA NCAA Division I National Coach of the Year and was a semifinalist for the 2021 Werner Ladder Naismith Women's Coach of the Year.

2019-20 * (Postseason cancelled due to the COVID-19 Pandemic)
 
In a basketball season unlike one that anyone has ever seen in collegiate athletics – one that will have an asterisk next to it moving forward – USF was still on the cusp of recording its seventh 20-win season in the last eight years, and advancing to its seventh-straight postseason tournament, before the COVID-19 Pandemic led to the cancellation of the remainder of the NCAA basketball season. In addition, the Bulls had to endure a second-consecutive year of season-ending and significant injuries, however, still recorded a 19–13 record and advanced to the semifinals of the American Athletic Conference tournament for the seventh-consecutive year. After starting the season getting votes in both the Associated Press and USA Today/WBCA Coaches Poll, ultimately getting as high as No. 21 in the AP and No. 20 in the Coaches poll, USF posted signature non-conference wins over No. 15 Texas, 64–57, and VCU, 77–55, and trailed No. 2 Baylor by three with three minutes left before falling in the end. In addition, the Bulls had their fans on the edge of their seats, yet again, at home against No. 5 UConn, leading the Huskies at the half and trailing by just five entering the fourth quarter before UConn pulled away in its final AAC appearance at the Yuengling Center.

Elena Tsineke, the team's leading scorer, was tabbed The American Freshman of the Year, in addition to being named to the All-Freshmen Team and Third Team All-Conference. Elisa Pinzan, the league leader in assists per game, was named Third Team All-Conference.

2018-19 (WNIT)

Decimated by season-ending injuries, USF still battled through its traditional daunting schedule and made its way back to the American Athletic Conference tournament semifinals for the sixth-straight season. The Bulls, who entered the season ranked No. 22 in the nation, also extended their postseason appearance streak to eight as they advanced to the WNIT second round. The Green and Gold posted marquee nonconference wins over Ohio State, 71–47, on the road, Oklahoma, 87–70, UCLA, 60–56, and George Washington, 63–30, en route to a 9–2 start before the injuries took effect. The Bulls also nearly stunned No. 2 UConn, at the Yuengling Center on Senior Night, trailing the Huskies by one with just over six minutes to play, before UConn ended the game on a 9–0 run. Enna Pehadzic was tabbed a Second Team AAC All-Conference selection while Sydni Harvey was named to the All-Freshman Team.

2017-18 (NCAA Tournament)

USF reached its fourth straight American Athletic Conference tournament championship game and made the Bulls’ fourth straight NCAA tournament appearance as Fernandez was named The American's Coach of the Year. Led by seniors Laia Flores and Maria Jespersen, who earned AP honorable-mention All-America honors, and junior guard Kitija Laksa, who joined Jespersen as a first-team all-conference selection. USF once again was ranked in the top 25 polls and completed the season with a 26–8 record. Among those wins was a trouncing of No. 13 Ohio State, 84–65, in front of a raucous Yuengling Center crowd.

2016-17 (NCAA Tournament)

The Bulls entered 2016 ranked in the AP Poll for 22-consecutive weeks. USF reached 20-wins faster than any other team in program history. The team, made up of 10 underclassmen tied the most successful nonconference record prior to the start of The American action. For the second straight year, Fernandez coached the league's Freshman of the Year (Tamara Henshaw) and a unanimous conference first team selection (Kitija Laksa). On January 17, 2017, the all-time winningest coach in USF basketball history reached his 300th career win in front of a home crowd at the Yuengling Center. The Bulls returned to the American Athletic Conference championship game for the third straight season.

2015-16 (NCAA Tournament)

The Bulls had a season to remember, returning to the NCAA Tournament for the third time in four years. USF ended the season in the top-25 for the second straight season. Along with coaching the program's first All-American, Fernandez lifted the team to new heights in 2015-16 and achieved the highest ranking in program history, No. 15 in both the AP and USA Today Coaches’ polls. USF made its 12th postseason run in 13 seasons and its fourth NCAA Tournament appearance in program history.

The graduating senior class left Tampa Bay as the first class to make three NCAA appearances, reach the postseason four times, and back-to-back trips to the American Athletic Conference Championship. Fernandez coached the program's first WBCA All-American, Courtney Williams, and the second-highest drafted Bull in USF Athletics history. Williams was selected No. 8 in the WNBA Draft by the Phoenix Mercury. Fernandez also guided Kitija Laksa to the program's second conference Freshman of the Year honor. Laksa was named the American Athletic Conference Freshman of the Year after an amazing debut with the Bulls.

2014-15 (NCAA Tournament)

Fernandez posted his and the program's sixth 20-win season (and third consecutive). Fernandez and the Bulls made history with two Top 25 rankings in the AP Poll en route to the best record in school history, 27–8. Fernandez and the Bulls reached a conference championship for the first time in school history, grabbed the best NCAA Tournament seed in school history as a six seed, and hosted the first and second rounds for the first time in school history. Fernandez coached an All-Region player for the third time in three years, and coached Courtney Williams to become one of the 12 Wade Trophy Finalists in the nation.

2013-14 (WNIT)

USF just missed the NCAA Tournament, losing to only Louisville and UConn in January, February and March before making a deep run in the WNIT Tournament. Fernandez came one game shy of playing for his second WNIT Championship as the Bulls fell to Rutgers at home April 2 on the heels of an in-game injury to the Bulls’ point guard. The 23–13 season went down as a major success, setting the stage for the 2014–15 run.

2012-13 (NCAA Tournament)

The season helped USF turn a corner in the eyes of the nation. The Bulls made just their second NCAA Tournament appearance, earning a berth with 21 regular-season wins, including back-to-back wins over No. 12 Louisville on the road and No. 21 Syracuse at home. The Bulls traveled to Texas Tech in the first round and defeated the Red Raiders 71-70 for their first ever NCAA Tournament victory, then lost to eventual Final Four team California in overtime, after a thrilling second-half comeback. Fernandez was the only coach in the nation to play all four Final Four teams in 2012–13, defeating Louisville, losing to Notre Dame and California in overtime, and facing UConn in the regular season. Earlier in the year, Coach Fernandez picked up win No. 200 of his career when USF defeated Detroit, 74–60. Following the 2012–13 season, Andrea Smith was drafted by the Connecticut Sun, adding to the trail of post-college success Fernandez’ players have enjoyed.

2011-12 (WNIT)

USF just missed the NCAA Tournament, as Fernandez guided USF to 19 wins despite having no true home games as the Sun Dome underwent renovations. Fernandez’ team advanced to the third round of the WNIT Tournament before falling to James Madison.

2010-11

USF finished the 2010-11 regular season with a 12-19 overall record and a 3-13 slate in conference play following its big 60–55 win over No. 17/19 Georgetown in Tampa. After the season concluded, USF broke ground on its state of the art practice facility, the Pam and Les Muma Basketball Center.

2009-10 (WNIT)

The Bulls advanced to their seventh consecutive postseason, earning an invitation to the 2010 Women's National Invitation Tournament and posted a 15–16 record.

2008-09 (WNIT Champions)

The season was a season that would make people sit up and take notice, as Fernandez guided the Bulls to their most successful campaign in its history. USF would register a school-record 27 wins while also finishing at least .500 (8-8) for the third time in the program's four years in the BIG EAST Conference. The Bulls logged plenty of regular season highlights, including a second-place finish in the Paradise Jam in St. Thomas, U.S.V.I. with wins over Iowa, in overtime, and Texas Tech. The only loss during the event would come at the hands of No. 3 ranked California. USF also defeated Rutgers on the road for the first time ever, and handed DePaul a crucial setback at the end of the season.

After advancing to its sixth-consecutive postseason tournament, the Bulls would make school history going 5–0 in the WNIT en route to the title. After defeating Florida Gulf Coast in overtime and Southeastern Conference foe Mississippi at home, USF would embark on a three-game, 10-day road odyssey that would begin in western New York with an 80–66 win at St. Bonaventure, then an 82–65 victory at Boston College. The Bulls would then head west to the nation's heartland where they would hand Kansas a 75–71 loss in the WNIT finals in front of a record crowd of 16,113 at historic Phog Allen Fieldhouse, capping the best season in the program's history.

2007-08 (WNIT)

During the campaign, the Bulls posted a 16–16 record and advanced to their fifth consecutive postseason event facing Florida Gulf Coast in the WNIT. The year didn't go without its share of thrilling nights as the “Green and Gold” knocked off No. 25 DePaul, 78–73, and defeated Syracuse in the BIG EAST Tournament first round, 68–67 in overtime, in what was looked at as one of the event's most exciting games. The Orange had just dropped out of the Top 25 prior to its loss to the Bulls.

2006-07 (WNIT)

Fernandez once again recorded several milestones in his and the program's history. On Dec. 28, 2006 with a 77–62 win over Vermont in the first round of the Saint Joseph's University Hawk Classic, Fernandez became the women's basketball team's career leader in wins surpassing former Bulls’ head coach and former Charlotte Sting leader Trudi Lacey.

Later in the year, he would reach a mark that had been a long time coming when he recorded his 100th career win in the Bulls’ final win of the season, a 66–49 win over Coppin State on March 19, 2007, in the second round of the WNIT. In addition, that appearance in the WNIT was the program's fourth straight for USF, a first for either basketball program at the school.

2005-06 (NCAA Tournament)

The 2005–06 season was the season that the Miami native etched his and his program's name in the history books at USF. Although they fell just short of the win total of the previous year, the Bulls recorded a memorable season that was capped off by the team advancing to its first-ever NCAA tournament. USF was seeded ninth in the Bridgeport Region and faced No. 8 seed Southern Cal at Old Dominion University in Norfolk, VA.

On their season-long road to “The Big Dance,” the Bulls defeated nationally ranked DePaul (79-77 OT) and Notre Dame (68-64 OT). When all the dust settled, USF boasted a 19–12 record and a 9-7 slate, which was good enough for a share of sixth place in its first year in the BIG EAST Conference.

The team's 2005-06 slate proved to be the toughest in school history. The Bulls faced eventual Final Four participants No. 7/8 North Carolina, No. 13/15 Michigan State, and No. 3/3 LSU all prior to their conference schedule, their first in the BIG EAST.

2004-05 (WNIT)

During the 2004-05 campaign, Fernandez guided his program to heights never seen before at USF - at least for the time being. The Bulls recorded their best record in school history at the time (21-11) and set a new school mark for wins in a season and wins in conference play (9-5). The team also advanced to its second-consecutive postseason WNIT, which included the program's first-ever victory with a win at home over Florida.

2003-04 (WNIT)

The Bulls recorded what was, then, the most successful season of his coaching career. The 33rd ranked class included freshmen Jessica Dickson, Nalini Miller and Rachael Sheats, along with junior college transfer Anedra Gilmore. That class also proved to pay dividends, and paid them quickly. Along with this core group of newcomers and veteran returnees, Fernandez helped the Bulls advance to the postseason for the first time in school history when they faced Richmond in the first round of the Women's National Invitation Tournament (WNIT).

2002-03

Fernandez followed his original recruiting class with a group that was tabbed 40th in America as it entered the 2002-03 campaign.

2001-02

Fernandez's first Division I recruiting class - the 2001-02 class - was ranked No. 36 in America by the All Star Girls Report, the highest ranked class in the history of the women's basketball program. That class provided instant dividends for USF as the Bulls would open the 01-02 campaign 7-0 en route to their first winning season in four years (14-13) after posting a meager 4-24 ledger the previous year. In that seven-game stretch, the Bulls defeated in-state rival and then BIG EAST Conference member Miami before falling to Florida for their first loss of the year.

2000-01

Fernandez was named head coach of the Bulls on Nov. 14, 2000, and despite a tough first season, Fernandez began to lay the foundation for what would be the success of the current USF women's basketball program.

Prior to USF

Fernandez got his start in coaching while working on his associate degree at Miami-Dade CC Kendall - where he earned his degree in 1991. Fernandez served as a student assistant coach for the men's basketball team and was immediately thrown into the fray with on-floor coaching, scouting, and most importantly, overseeing recruiting correspondence and getting his name out in front of coaches around the state.

It was at Miami-Dade that Fernandez met Cesar Odio, who not only saw his tremendous potential and hired him as a student assistant, but then promoted him to a full-time assistant coach upon his graduation in 1991. He would stay at Miami-Dade for one season (1991–92) before becoming the assistant boys’ basketball coach at Miami's Sunset High School (1992–94).

Following his two seasons at Sunset, Fernandez and Odio would renew acquaintances when Odio was tabbed head men's basketball coach at Barry University in Miami Shores, Fla. (1994–96). Fernandez came along as Odio's top assistant and immediately established himself as a coach that had a sharp eye for talent and potential. During his brief two-year stay at Barry, Fernandez helped the Buccaneers to consecutive winning seasons, after the program only produced just two in the first 10 years, and a combined 34–21 record.

Fernandez entered the world of girls’ basketball in 1996, when he secured his first head coaching job at Miami's Lourdes Academy. During his three seasons at Lourdes, Fernandez led the Bobcats to a stellar 83-16 (.838) record and a trip to the state 5A championship game in 1998 where they finished as the runner-up. In addition to his coaching responsibilities at Lourdes, Fernandez established valuable roots among Florida and high school coaches from around the nation as director and founder of the successful Miami Suns AAU program.

Fernandez would then break into collegiate women's basketball when he returned to Barry for his second of two tours of duty at the school. In his second stint, he served one year (1999-00) as the top assistant coach for the Buccaneers. Although it was just one season, Fernandez helped Barry record the second-most wins in the program's history as the Buccaneers posted a 22–8 record and the program's second-best slate ever in the Sunshine State Conference at 10–4. The team's 22 wins that season is still just one of three 20-wins campaigns for Barry since the women's basketball team started competing during the 1988–89 season.

After graduating from Miami-Dade Kendall, Fernandez earned his bachelor's degree in physical education in 1994 from Florida International University. Along with his coaching duties at the beginning of his professional career, Fernandez also taught physical education at Miami's Coral Reef Senior High School, Southwest Senior High School and Hialeah Middle School.

Fernandez and his wife, Tonya, live in Tampa with their daughters, Sydnie, Alex, Taylor, Brianna and Brooke.

Head Coaching Record

References

External links
 Official bio

1971 births
Living people
American women's basketball coaches
Basketball coaches from Florida
Florida International University alumni
High school basketball coaches in the United States
Junior college men's basketball coaches in the United States
South Florida Bulls women's basketball coaches
University of South Florida faculty